Alexander Watson Batte House, also known as The Old Place, is a historic home located at Jarratt, Greensville County, Virginia. It was built between 1815 and 1835, and is a -story hall-parlor house built on a fieldstone foundation.  It features massive fieldstone chimneys flanking the gable roofed dwelling.  Also on the property is a contributing 19th century barn.

It was listed on the National Register of Historic Places in 1991.

References

Houses on the National Register of Historic Places in Virginia
Federal architecture in Virginia
Houses completed in 1835
Houses in Greensville County, Virginia
National Register of Historic Places in Greensville County, Virginia